My Bride Is a Mermaid is an anime series adapted from the manga of the same title by Tahiko Kimura. Produced Gonzo and directed by Seiji Kishi, the series aired from April 1 to September 30, 2007 on TV Tokyo in Japan. It follows the adventures of Nagasumi Michishio, a young man who is saved from drowning by a mermaid named Sun Seto. In an attempt to avoid being sentenced to death, the Seto family decides that Nagasumi and Sun are a married couple. The series adapts the first 28 chapters of the manga series, which leads into an original, self-contained story arc for the remainder of the season.

Episode list
The episode titles are related to titles of movies and novels.

OVAs

References 

My Bride Is a Mermaid